Pontoon Dock is a station on the Docklands Light Railway (DLR) in Silvertown in east London, which is on the Woolwich Arsenal branch, opened on 2 December 2005. It is located in the east of Silvertown in the London Borough of Newham, in the redevelopment zone known as Silvertown Quays, and is in Travelcard Zone 3.

History
Originally DLR trains from Canning Town ran easterly to Royal Victoria and on to Beckton. On 2 December 2005 the King George V branch (since extended to Woolwich Arsenal) was opened and gave another, more southeasterly, route on which there are now four intermediate stations, West Silvertown, Pontoon Dock, London City Airport, and King George V.
During the London 2012 Olympic games it was connected by a pathway over the road to the exit of the ExCeL centre.

Location
The track through Pontoon Dock parallels the (A1020) North Woolwich Road, and gives excellent views to the south across the Thames Barrier Park of the Thames Barrier. Pontoon Dock station is near the small eponymous quay,  the Barrier Point residential complex  and Royal Wharf, a large commercial and residential development on the riverside, which now covers the location previously owned by Brunner Mond, where the infamous Silvertown explosion occurred and where there is now a small memorial.

As of September 2016, this memorial has been moved to the main park of the Royal Wharf development.

A crossover at Pontoon Dock allows trains to reverse in service disruptions.

Connections
London Buses routes 241 and 330 serve the station.

Services
The service interval through Pontoon Dock between Bank, in the City of London and Woolwich Arsenal is ten minutes off peak. In peak hours, this increases to every eight minutes, with an additional service to Stratford International, providing a service every four minutes between Canning Town and Woolwich Arsenal.

References

External links

 Pontoon Dock DLR station page

Docklands Light Railway stations in the London Borough of Newham
Railway stations in Great Britain opened in 2005
Silvertown